Robert Conness (1867/68 – 1941) was an American stage and film actor. Born in 1867 or 1868 he began in the theatre in 1894 and performed in vaudeville and on Broadway. He began in silent film in 1910 and made his last film appearance in 1918. He was married to actress Helen Strickland.

Filmography
Her First Appearance (1910 short)
The Piece of Lace (1910 short)
Bootles' Baby (1910 short)
Monsieur (1911 short)
How the Hungry Man Was Fed (1911 short)
The Wager and the Wage Earners (1911 short)
Van Bibber's Experiment (1911 short)
His Misjudgment (1911 short)
The Little Organist (1912 short)
The Stolen Nickel (1912 short)
His Daughter (1912 short)
Children Who Labor (1912 short)
Church and Country (1912 short)
The Blue Coyote Cherry Crop (1914 short)
The Long Way (1914 short)
A Fragment of Ash (1914 short)
The Case of the Vanished Bonds (1914 short)
Bootle's Baby (1914 short) (possibly a rerelease or remake of 1910 short)
Dickson's Diamonds (1914 short)
The Last of the Hargroves (1914 short)
The Colonel of the Red Hussars (1914 short)
The Man Who Vanished (1914 short)
Young Mrs. Winthrop (1915 short)
The Banker's Double (1915 short)
Her Husband's Son (1915 short)
In Spite of All (1915 short)
The Portrait in the Attic (1915 short)
The Stoning (1915 short)
The House of the Lost Court (1915 short)
The Tragedies of the Crystal Globe (1915 short)
 On Dangerous Paths (1915)
June Friday (1915)
The Ploushshare (1915)
Gladiola (1915)
Children of Eve (1915)
The Truth About Helen (1915)
 The Heart of the Hills (1916)
The Martyrdom of Philip Strong (1916)
The Witching Hour (1916)
A Message to Garcia (1916)
 The Rainbow (1917)
A Song of Sixpence (1917)
The Ghost of Old Morro (1917)
 A Pair of Sixes (1918)

References

External links
 
Robert Conness at IBDb.com
Robert Conness formal portrait(NYPublic Library, Billy Rose collection)

1867 births
1941 deaths
Actors from Illinois
People from LaSalle, Illinois
Actors from Portland, Maine
Burials at Moravian Cemetery